Ligdus is a genus of jumping spiders found in Burma. It contains only one species, Ligdus chelifer.

The species was described in 1895 from a single female specimen. Eugène Simon thought it to be close to Copocrossa. The habitus of an immature specimen, already showing the large spiny front legs, was drawn by Proszynski in 1984.

Footnotes

References
  (2000): An Introduction to the Spiders of South East Asia. Malaysian Nature Society, Kuala Lumpur.
  (2007): The world spider catalog, version 8.0. American Museum of Natural History.

Further reading
  (1984): Diagnostic drawings of less well known Salticidae/Araneae, an atlas. WSRP, Siedlce, Poland.

Salticidae
Arthropods of Myanmar
Monotypic Salticidae genera
Spiders of Asia